823 Naval Air Squadron was a Fleet Air Arm aircraft squadron before and during World War II.

History

Pre-war
823 squadron was formed on 3 April 1933 by a merger of No's 441 and 448 (Fleet Spotter Reconnaissance) Flights aboard HMS Glorious, a cruiser converted to an aircraft carrier in the 1920s. The new squadron was equipped with Fairey IIIFs and served in the Mediterranean. Following a ship refit the squadron split its aircraft between HMS Courageous and Glorious when they sailed to the Mediterranean in August 1935 in response to the Abyssinian crisis. The squadron, now re-equipped with Fairey Swordfish, was transferred to Admiralty control in 1940.

World War II
In the early part of the war the squadron sailed aboard HMS Glorious into the Red Sea and Indian Ocean to attack enemy shipping, returning to the Mediterranean in Jan 1940. They operated from Hal Far, Malta until March 1940, until they were needed to take part in the defence of Norway. There HMS Glorious was sunk by the German battleships Gneisenau and Scharnhorst on 8 June 1940, and half of the squadron (5 aircraft) lost. The remainder flew from RNAS Hatston with 821 Squadron on 21 June 1940 to attack Scharnhorst, with little or no success. On 24 July 1940 they attacked enemy destroyers and shipping off Norway but were disbanded at Hatston in December 1940.

In November 1941 the squadron was reformed at Crail airfield in Fife, Scotland as a torpedo bomber reconnaissance (TBR) Swordfish squadron, subsequently sailing on HMS Furious in August 1942 with 9 Albacores for convoy duties. In September 1942 the squadron was attached to No 16 Group, Coastal Command at RAF Manston and RAF Tangmere for anti-submarine patrols in the English Channel.

In June 1943 the squadron was re-equipped with Fairey Barracuda IIs at Lee-on-Solent and joined the 11th TBR Wing in southern India. They were finally disbanded in July 1944 at Katukurunda Airport after being merged with 822 squadron.

Aircraft operated

References

Sqn Histories 712–825
Fleet Air Arm archive

800 series Fleet Air Arm squadrons
Military units and formations established in 1933